Simon Stevenson (born 18 February 1972) is an English darts player, who currently competes in Professional Darts Corporation events.

Career
Stevenson first rose to prominence after winning the Rileys Plymouth qualifier for the 2014 UK Open. He defeated Ian Jones, Jason Lovett, Mark Barilli and Rocco Maes to reach the last 32 before losing 9-5 to Jamie Lewis.

Stevenson gained the nickname 'The Mirror Man' in a late 2014 clash, matching exactly dart-for-dart on three unusual finishes by opponent Darren 'Hardbox' Hardyment before eventually clinching a resounding victory in the West Midlands derby. It was 6th time lucky for Stevenson who self-proclaimedly suffered 5 years bad luck at the event before triumphing.

The following year, he again qualified for the 2015 UK Open via the Rileys Reading qualifier, but could not repeat his 2014 performance as he lost 5-2 to Dave Prins in the preliminary round.

Stevenson first claimed a PDC Tour Card in 2016, defeating Lee Evans on Day 1 of Q-School. His performances in his first year on the PDC Pro Tour, including his first quarter final in August, resulted in him qualifying for the 2016 Players Championship Finals as the 44th seed, drawing Jelle Klaasen in the first round. He led Klaasen 3-1 and 4-2 but then lost four legs in a row to be defeated.

He subsequently qualified for the 2017 PDC World Darts Championship at Alexandra Palace by beating Scott Taylor at the PDPA Qualifier in Wigan, but lost 2-1 in sets to Austria's Zoran Lerchbacher in the preliminary round. Stevenson qualified for the 2017 World Series of Darts Finals by defeating Andy Jenkins 5-4 in their deciding match. He defeated Jan Dekker 6-3 in the first round before losing 6-5 to James Wade.

At the end of 2017, Stevenson was ranked 77 in the world and therefore outside of the Top 64 who automatically retain their Tour Cards. He returned to the PDC Q School and regained his Tour Card after finishing 5th on the UK Q-School Order of Merit. In the first and last 2018 UK Open Qualifiers, Stevenson reached the last 16, eventually losing 6-3 to Michael van Gerwen and 6-5 to Peter Wright. These runs secured a Third Round entry in the UK Open. He was defeated 10-6 by James Wade in the third round.

Stevenson went on a run to the Quarter-Finals of the 2019 UK Open. He defeated Adrian Gray, Mark Webster, Raymond van Barneveld, Kim Huybrechts and Dave Chisnall before losing 10-5 to Gerwyn Price in the Quarter-Finals. It was Stevenson’s first run to a televised Quarter-Final.

World Championship results

PDC

 2017: Prem round (lost to Zoran Lerchbacher 1-2)
 2019: First round (lost to Ted Evetts 0-3)

Performance timeline

References

External links

1972 births
Living people
English darts players
British Darts Organisation players
Professional Darts Corporation former tour card holders